Seo Jung-hwa (born 27 September 1990) is a South Korean freestyle skier specializing in mogul skiing, who has competed since 2006. She started attending USC in 2008. She qualified for 2010 Winter Olympics in 2009 by placing 15th in the 2009 World Championships. Seo went on to compete in the 2010 Olympics in moguls, where she placed 21st.

Seo also competed in the 2018 Winter Olympics in moguls, finishing 30th.

References

South Korean female freestyle skiers
Freestyle skiers at the 2010 Winter Olympics
Freestyle skiers at the 2014 Winter Olympics
Freestyle skiers at the 2018 Winter Olympics
Olympic freestyle skiers of South Korea
Living people
1990 births
Freestyle skiers at the 2011 Asian Winter Games
Freestyle skiers at the 2017 Asian Winter Games
Competitors at the 2015 Winter Universiade
Sportspeople from Gyeonggi Province